Enter the Fat Dragon may refer to:
 Enter the Fat Dragon (1978 film), a Hong Kong martial arts film
 Enter the Fat Dragon (2020 film), a Hong Kong martial arts comedy film